Anthrenus pimpinellae is a species of beetle found natively in Europe, northern Africa, Asia and portions of the Oriental region; it has also been introduced to parts of North America.

Description 
Size of about 3–4 mm. Elytra black with white and brown scales.

References

External links
Anthrenus pimpinellae at Fauna Europaea

pimpinellae
Beetles described in 1775
Taxa named by Johan Christian Fabricius